MH-18, published by Rodale, Inc. in Emmaus, Pennsylvania, was a magazine covering teen lifestyle. The magazine was started as a quarterly publication in August 2000. A youth-oriented version of Men's Health magazine, it was targeted at 13- to 18-year-old males. The last issue was published on 12 November 2001.

References

Bimonthly magazines published in the United States
Lifestyle magazines published in the United States
Men's magazines published in the United States
Quarterly magazines published in the United States
Defunct magazines published in the United States
Magazines established in 2000
Magazines disestablished in 2001
Magazines published in Pennsylvania
Men's Health (magazine)
Rodale, Inc.
Teen magazines